Rivers Wash Over Me is a 2009 drama film directed by John G. Young. Young shares the screenplay with Darien Sills-Evans. The film was produced by Sills-Evans, with Dexter Davis as executive producer.

Plot
The film touches on race relations, incest, drugs, and growing up gay in the American South. A recent New York City transplant, Sequan Greene (Derrick L. Middleton) has been sent to live in Alabama after the recent death of his mother. He is brutally raped by his cousin Michael Wilis (Cameron Mitchell Mason). It becomes clear that Michael also is gay - a victim as well as a victimizer. He says, "I can’t be a faggot ...You’re the faggot. You’re my faggot." Sequan is also bullied and beaten up at school.

Sequan soon finds a friend in Lori Anderson (Elizabeth Dennis), the girlfriend of drug dealer/basketball player Ahmed Robins (Duane McLaughlin). Lori is the town's "bad girl" who has a heart of gold. Although she freebases, snorts coke throughout the school day, steals guns and sleeps with the town basketball star, she is immediately taken by admiration of Sequan and his brazen nonconformity. Despite Sequan's unwillingness, Lori manages to befriend him, bringing him out of his shell and eventually introducing him to both moonshine and her gay brother, Jake (Aidan Schultz-Meyer).

Cast
 Derrick L. Middleton as Sequan Greene
 Aidan Schultz-Meyer as Jake Anderson
 Elizabeth Dennis as Lori Anderson
 Darien Sills-Evans as Charles King
 Cameron Mitchell Mason as Michael Willis
 Duane McLaughlin as Ahmed Robins
 Pamela Holden Stewart as Alice
 Julia Carothers Hughes as Celeste Anderson
 Terrance Epps as Coach Williams
 Tina Jetter as Charity
 Leslie Jones as LuEllen
 Paul Kelly as Mr. Hack
 Alain Lauture as Skinny Tim Buchanan
 Sonequa Martin as Shawna King
 Conor Romero as Billy
 Xosha Roquemore as Racine Buchanan
 Chester A. Sims II as Mayor Rickets
 Don Striano as Tom Lemmings
 Damian Washington as Dwayne
 Eric Watson Williams as Deputy Lewis Ratch

References

External links
 
 
 

2009 films
2009 drama films
American LGBT-related films
African-American drama films
African-American LGBT-related films
Films about drugs
Incest in film
Films about race and ethnicity
2009 LGBT-related films
2000s English-language films
2000s American films